The Cordon is a 2002 Yugoslavian film directed by Goran Marković. It won Grand Prix des Amériques, the main prize at the Montreal World Film Festival. Marković's film focuses on one police “cordon” (patrol) against the 1996–1997 protests in Serbia that attempted to overthrow Slobodan Milošević.

References

2002 films
Films set in Belgrade 
Cultural depictions of Slobodan Milošević 
Films shot in Belgrade